Cheick Tiemoko Diabate (born 21 January 2002) is an English professional footballer who plays as a defender for League One club Exeter City.

Career

Exeter City
Diabate started his career at Stevenage before a move to Exeter City in 2018. He first appeared in a matchday squad during Exeter's 2–0 away EFL Trophy group-stage victory over Newport County in October 2019, and then later that season enjoyed a brief loan spell with Buckland Athletic. In a disrupted 2020–21 campaign, Diabate had loan spells at Bideford and Tiverton Town before making his Exeter debut in November 2020, featuring for the final twenty-eight minutes of their EFL Trophy tie with West Bromwich Albion U23s, which resulted in a 4–0 win for The Grecians.

On 14 July 2021, Diabate joined Southern League Premier Division South side, Truro City and went onto make his debut during a 1–1 draw with Walton Casuals a month later. He then scored his first career goal in a 4–1 away victory over Poole Town in October before eventually returning to Exeter two months later following an injury crisis at the Devon-based side. He made his league debut for the club just a week later in a 2–1 defeat to Sutton United. He went on to feature heavily in the second half of Exeter’s season as they secured promotion to League One. Diabate was rewarded with a new two-year contract in June 2022.

Personal life 
Diabate's cousin Mory Koné is a former professional footballer, having played for Troyes, Le Mans, and Parma.

Career statistics

Honours
Exeter City
League Two runner-up: 2021–22

References

External links

2002 births
Living people
English footballers
English people of Ivorian descent
Association football defenders
Stevenage F.C. players
Exeter City F.C. players
Buckland Athletic F.C. players
Bideford A.F.C. players
Tiverton Town F.C. players
Truro City F.C. players
Western Football League players
Southern Football League players
English Football League players